The IBM Tape Library 3584 also known as TS3500/TS4500 Tape Library.  The number of tape drives it contains, is dependent on the frame's sub-model.

References

3584